Timeless Gift 遗情未了 is a 2004 Chinese television series which aired in Singapore. It was produced by Mediacorp TV Channel 8.

The serial starred Christopher Lee, Huang Bi Ren, Michelle Chong, Patricia Mok, Zhang Wenxiang, Joey Swee, Rayson Tan, Li Yinzhu and Chen Shucheng.

Nominations
The drama serial earned some nominations in the Star Awards 2004:

External links
Theme song
Official Website (English Edition)
Official Website (Chinese Edition)

2000s Singaporean television series
2004 Singaporean television series debuts
2004 Singaporean television series endings
Singapore Chinese dramas
Channel 8 (Singapore) original programming